1,2-Dichloropropane is an organic compound classified as a chlorocarbon.  It is a colorless, flammable liquid with a sweet odor. it is obtained as a byproduct of the production of epichlorohydrin, which is produced on a large scale.

Uses
1,2-Dichloropropane is an intermediate in the production of perchloroethylene and other chlorinated chemicals. It was once used as a soil fumigant, chemical intermediate, as well as an industrial solvent and was found in paint strippers, varnishes, and furniture finish removers but some of these uses have been discontinued.

Carcinogenity
Following several cases of bile duct cancer among Japanese printing firm employees, an investigation by the Japanese Ministry of Health, Labour and Welfare concluded in March 2013 that these cases were likely due to the use of cleaning agents containing 1,2-dichloropropane. Thus, there is reasonable evidence that 1,2-dichloropropane may be a carcinogen.

Data from animal studies show tumor growth in the liver and mammary glands. Further animal studies involving inhalation toxicity data has caused the National Institute for Occupational Safety and Health to classify 1,2-dichloropropane as a carcinogen and IDLH.

References

Chloroalkanes
Sweet-smelling chemicals